Guanabara may refer to:
 Guanabara (state), a former state in Brazil
 Guanabara Bay, a bay in Brazil
 Guanabara (Joinville), a neighborhood in Santa Catarina state, Brazil
 Jardim Guanabara, a neighborhood in Rio de Janeiro state, Brazil
 Guanabara Esporte Clube
 Taça Guanabara
 MV Guanabara